Kevin J. Patel (born September 23, 2000) is an American climate justice activist and community organizer. Patel has openly shared his experience as a frontline climate activist diagnosed with respiratory issues. He is also the founder and executive director of OneUpAction, an international youth-led nonprofit based in the U.S. that supports marginalized youth by providing them with resources to create change in their communities.

Early life and education 
Kevin J. Patel lives with his father, mother, and older brother, in Los Angeles, California. He grew up in South Central Los-Angeles. He has studied at Carver Middle School, where he first began his advocacy. He then went to Santee Education Complex, where he started the first environmental club. In 2019, he was involved in the Youth Climate Strike L.A. He was a leader in Fridays for Future Southern California. As of 2020, Patel was starting his second year at Loyola Marymount University where he is studying Political Science. In 2021, he participated in a panel "Taking Action for People and the Planet".

Activism 
In 2012, Patel worked with his community, teaching his fellow peers about food inequalities within South Los Angeles at Carver Middle School. Later in 2013, he was diagnosed with irregular heartbeat/heart palpitations due to Los Angeles’ poor air quality.

In 2019, he founded OneUpAction International and through his work, he has collaborated with his community to create the first Youth Climate Commission in Los Angeles County in efforts to amplify youth voices on the climate crisis. Patel is a United Nations Togetherband Ambassador for Sustainable Develop Goals 13 & 14. He also is a National Geographic Young Explorer. Patel serves on the Youthtopia World Circle of Youth Council, Climate Power Advisory Council, World Economic Forum's 1 Trillion trees U.S. Stakeholder Council, and the Intersectional Environmentalist Council. OneUpAction is an intersectional youth-led activist organization founded by Patel in 2019 working to provide resources to youth advocates.

References

External links 

People from Los Angeles
Year of birth uncertain
Living people
Youth climate activists
2000 births
American child activists
American environmentalists